"In the City" is the debut single by English band The Jam from their album of the same title. It was released on 29 April 1977 and reached No. 40 on the UK Singles Chart in May 1977, making it their first Top 40 single and the beginning of their streak of 18 consecutive Top 40 singles.

While the album was not particularly successful in the UK Albums Chart, the song was the UK's first introduction to The Jam, and was characteristic of Paul Weller's youth anthems—mod-influenced celebrations of British youth—that dominated the band's early output.

Musically, the song is in the vein of the band's first album, a mod/punk number influenced by The Who's early music, but with an energy and attitude updated for the punk era. "In the City" borrowed its title from an obscure Who song of the same name, which was released in 1966 as the B-side of the "I'm a Boy" single (and which can now be found as a bonus track on most CD re-issues of their 1966 album A Quick One). 

The Sex Pistols' single "Holidays in the Sun", released six months after The Jam's "In the City", is thought to have taken its descending introductory chord pattern from the latter, though "Holidays" intro consists of C, B, A, G and played using fifth chords (power chords, empty chords ect) the "In the City" intro consists of Gsus, G, D, G and played using major chords.

Lyrically, the song is a celebration of youth in the big city, and of what Paul Weller called the "young idea", reflecting Weller's optimism for the punk movement. There was also a direct reference to police brutality: "In the city, there's a thousand men in uniform/And I hear they now have the right to kill a man".

In May 2002, Polydor Records decided to commemorate the 25th anniversary of The Jam by re-releasing their debut single in its original packaging, in its 7" vinyl record format and at its original price of 75 pence. The limited pressing sold out immediately, and the song made the Top 40 one more time, peaking at No. 36; higher than it did in its original release and two subsequent reissues. It became the first single to chart in the UK Top 40 based alone on limited edition 7" sales since the late 1970s. Only one single ("Freakin' Out" by Graham Coxon) has since charted in the UK Top 40 alone on limited edition 7" single sales.

Pitchfork Media ranked the track as being one of the "great debut singles".

References

1977 debut singles
1977 songs
Songs written by Paul Weller
The Jam songs